Evolución, (English: Evolution) a band that hails from San José, Costa Rica, started out in 1997. Their members originated in the underground alternative rock movement that struck the country in the early 1990s. They released "Musica para Sentir" (1997) their first album and quickly caught on to the local rock festivals. An immediate fan-favorite band, they released Absorbiendo la Magia (2001). Their break-through album "Mundo de Fantasia" (2003), was one of the top selling albums in Costa Rica for that year. Their video for "Voy por Ella" had huge success and great national exposure. "Digalo" (2004) helped consolidate the band's fan base and exposure through several videos for this album. In 2005 released "Sentimiento Antisocial" an album sound-alikes of demos from 1995-1998. Two of the band's members, Balerom and Moldo are now also solo artists.

Their latest album, "Amor Artificial" (2007) became the 3rd best selling album in Costa Rica in 2007, and it was released mid-year. This album shows a more mature band, with much more musical diversity and great melodic tunes.

Discography

Studio albums 

Costa Rican rock music groups
Rock en Español music groups
Musical groups established in 1997